"Sunrise/Sunset (Love Is All)" (stylised as Sunrise/Sunset ～LOVE is ALL～) is Japanese singer Ayumi Hamasaki's forty-sixth (forty-seventh overall) single, released on August 12, 2009. The song "Sunrise: Love is All" is used as the theme song to the 2009 Japanese drama show, Dandy Daddy? In addition, the song "Sunset: Love is All" was used in advertisements for the Panasonic Lumix FX-60 digital camera. The single debuted at #1 on Oricon weekly charts and became her 44th Top 10 single, making her the first artist to have 44 Top 10 singles in Oricon history.
The single became Hamasaki's 21st consecutive single to debut at number-one position since her 2002 single "Free & Easy" on the Oricon weekly charts, making her the first solo artist and the first female artist to have 21 consecutive singles to debut at number-one position. It is also her 33rd number-one single on the Oricon weekly charts.

Music video

The music videos for Sunrise and Sunset were filmed on a sightseeing tower at the bay of Chiba prefecture, Kantō. This tower, the Futtsu-Misaki, is a 100-year commemoration structure for the end of Meiji period (1868). 
Members of TeamAyu (Hamasaki's official fan club) were able to apply to be part of the audience for the PVs. Almost 1000 people applied for participation, and about 300 of those were selected.

 The choreographers for the PVs were Ayumi Hamasaki's dancers Zin for Sunrise and Maro for Sunset. The PVs feature all of Ayumi's dancers and 300 fans.

In the first video, Sunrise, Ayumi is hopping around and laughing; the fans are waving towels; and the male dancers are shouting, dancing, and animating the fans. The entire video shows Ayumi's performance.

The second video, Sunset, is set on the same structure as the first, the morning light having been replaced by a sun setting in the background. This video features only the female dancers and Ayumi. Like the first one, the video shows only Ayumi's 'Sunset' performance.

Track listing

Performances
 August 8, 2009 - CDTV (Sunrise: Love is All)
 August 9, 2009 - Music Japan (Sunrise: Love is All)
 August 14, 2009 - Music Station (Sunrise: Love is All)
 August 14, 2009 - Music Fighter (Sunrise: Love is All)
 August 15, 2009 - Music Fair (Sunrise/Sunset: Love is All, Boys & Girls)
 August 17, 2009 - Hey! Hey! Hey! Music Champ

Charts

Oricon sales charts

Billboard Japan

Overseas charts

References

2009 singles
Ayumi Hamasaki songs
Oricon Weekly number-one singles
Songs written by Ayumi Hamasaki
Japanese television drama theme songs
RIAJ Digital Track Chart number-one singles
2009 songs
Avex Trax singles
Song recordings produced by Max Matsuura